Ortal is an Israeli settlement organized as a kibbutz in the northern Golan Heights. The settlement was established as a kibbutz after Israel occupied the area in the Six Day War in 1967. The international community considers Israeli settlements in the Golan Heights illegal under international law, but the Israeli government disputes this.

Economy
As of 2006, the kibbutz vineyard, affiliated with the Golan Heights Winery, produced three varieties of grapes: chardonnay, cabernet, and merlot.

See also
Israeli-occupied territories

References

Non-religious Israeli settlements
Kibbutzim
Populated places established in 1978
Golan Regional Council
Populated places in Northern District (Israel)
1978 establishments in the Israeli Military Governorate